See also Nonlinear partial differential equation, List of partial differential equation topics and List of nonlinear ordinary differential equations.

A–F
{|class="wikitable" style="background: white; color: black; text-align: left"
|-style="background: #eee"
!Name
!Dim
!Equation
!Applications
|-
|Bateman-Burgers equation
|1+1 
| 
|Fluid mechanics
|-
|Benjamin–Bona–Mahony 
|1+1 
|
|Fluid mechanics
|-
|Benjamin–Ono 
|1+1 
| 
| internal waves in deep water
|-
|Boomeron
|1+1
|
|Solitons
|-
|Boltzmann equation
|1+6
|
|Statistical mechanics
|-
|Born–Infeld
|1+1
|
| Electrodynamics
|-
|Boussinesq
| 1+1 
| 
|Fluid mechanics
|-
|Boussinesq type equation
| 1+1 
| 
|Fluid mechanics
|-
|Buckmaster
|1+1
|
|Thin viscous fluid sheet flow
|-
|Cahn–Hilliard equation
|Any
|
|Phase separation
|-
|Calabi flow
|Any
|
|Calabi–Yau manifolds
|-
| Camassa–Holm
|1+1
|
|Peakons
|-
|Carleman
|1+1
|
|
|-
||Cauchy momentum
|any
|
|Momentum transport
|-
| Chafee–Infante equation
|
| 
|
|-
|Clairaut equation
|any
|
|Differential geometry
|-
|Clarke's equation
|1+1
|
|Combustion
|-
|Complex Monge–Ampère
|Any
| lower order terms
|Calabi conjecture
|-
|Constant astigmatism
|1+1
|
|Differential geometry
|-
|Davey–Stewartson
|1+2
|
|Finite depth waves
|-
|Degasperis–Procesi
|1+1
|
|Peakons
|-
|Dispersive long wave
|1+1
|, 
|
|-
|Drinfeld–Sokolov–Wilson
|1+1
|
|
|-
|Dym equation
|1+1
|
|Solitons
|-
|Eckhaus equation
|1+1
|
|Integrable systems
|-
|Eikonal equation
|any
|
|optics
|-
|Einstein field equations
| Any
|
|General relativity
|-
|Ernst equation
|2
|
|
|-
| Estevez–Mansfield–Clarkson equation
|
| 
|
|-
|Euler equations
|1+3
|
|non-viscous fluids
|-
|Fisher's equation
|1+1
|
|Gene propagation
|-
|FitzHugh–Nagumo model
|1+1
|
|Biological neuron model
|-
|Föppl–von Kármán equations
|
| 
|Solid Mechanics
|}

G–K
{|class="wikitable" style="background: white; color: black; text-align: left"
|-style="background: #eee"
!Name
!Dim
!Equation
!Applications
|-
|G equation
|1+3
|
| turbulent combustion
|-
|Generic scalar transport 
|1+3
|
|transport
|-
|Ginzburg–Landau
|1+3
|
|Superconductivity
|-
|Gross–Pitaevskii
|
|
| Bose–Einstein condensate
|-
|Gyrokinetics equation
|
|
| Microturbulence in plasma
|-
||Guzmán
|
|
| Hamilton–Jacobi–Bellman equation for risk aversion
|-
|Hartree equation
|Any
|
|
|-
|Hasegawa–Mima
|1+3
|
|Turbulence in plasma
|-
|Heisenberg ferromagnet
|1+1
|
|Magnetism
|-
|Hicks
|1+1
|
|Fluid dynamics
|-
|Hunter–Saxton
|1+1
|
|Liquid crystals
|-
|Ishimori equation
|1+2
|
|Integrable systems
|-
|Kadomtsev –Petviashvili 
|1+2
|
|Shallow water waves
|-
|Kardar–Parisi–Zhang equation 
|1+3
|
|Stochastics
|-
|von Karman
|2 
|
|
|-
|Kaup
|1+1
|
|
|-
|Kaup–Kupershmidt
|1+1
| 
|Integrable systems
|-
|Klein–Gordon–Maxwell
|any
|
|
|-
|Klein–Gordon (nonlinear)
|any
|
| Relativistic quantum mechanics
|-
|Khokhlov–Zabolotskaya
|1+2
|
|
|-
|Korteweg–de Vries (KdV)
|1+1
|
|Shallow  waves, Integrable systems

|-
|KdV (super)
|1+1
|
|

|-
|colspan="4" |There are  more minor variations listed in the article on KdV equations. 
|-
|Kuramoto–Sivashinsky equation
|
|
|Combustion
|}

L–Q
{|class="wikitable" style="background: white; color: black; text-align: left"
|-style="background: #eee"
!Name
!Dim
!Equation
!Applications
|-
|Landau–Lifshitz model
|1+n
|
|Magnetic field in solids
|-
|Lin–Tsien equation
|1+2
| 
|
|-
|Liouville equation
|any
|
|
|-
|Liouville–Bratu–Gelfand equation
|any
|
|combustion, astrophysics
|-
|Logarithmic Schrödinger equation
|any
|
|Superfluids, Quantum gravity
|-
|Minimal surface
|3
|
|minimal surfaces
|-
|Monge–Ampère 
|any
| lower order terms
|
|-
|Navier–Stokes(and its derivation)
|1+3
|
+ mass conservation: 
+ an equation of state to relate p and ρ, e.g. for an incompressible flow:   
|Fluid flow, gas flow
|-
|Nonlinear Schrödinger (cubic)
|1+1
|
|optics, water waves
|-
|Nonlinear Schrödinger (derivative)
|1+1
|
|optics, water waves
|-
|Omega equation
|1+3
| 
|atmospheric physics
|-
|Plateau
|2
|
|minimal surfaces
|-
|Pohlmeyer–Lund–Regge
|2
|
|
|-
|Porous medium
|1+n
|
|diffusion
|-
|Prandtl
|1+2
|, 
|boundary layer
|}

R–Z, α–ω
{|class="wikitable" style="background: white; color: black; text-align: left"
|-style="background: #eee"
!Name
!Dim
!Equation
!Applications
|-
|Rayleigh
|1+1
|
|
|-
|Ricci flow 
|Any
|
|Poincaré conjecture
|-
|Richards equation
|1+3
|
|Variably saturated flow in porous media
|-
|Rosenau–Hyman
|1+1
|
| compacton solutions
|-
|Sawada–Kotera
|1+1
|
|
|-
|Schlesinger
| Any
|
|isomonodromic deformations
|-
|Seiberg–Witten 
|1+3
|
|Seiberg–Witten invariants, QFT
|-
|Shallow water
|1+2
|
|shallow water waves
|-
|Sine–Gordon
|1+1
|
|Solitons, QFT
|-
|Sinh–Gordon
|1+1
|
|Solitons, QFT
|-
|Sinh–Poisson
|1+n
|
|Fluid Mechanics
|-
|-
|Swift–Hohenberg
|any
|
|pattern forming
|-
|Thomas
|2
|
|
|-
|Thirring
|1+1
|, 
|Dirac field, QFT
|-
|Toda lattice
|any
|
|
|-
|Veselov–Novikov 
|1+2
|, 
| shallow water waves
|-
|Vorticity equation
|
|
|Fluid Mechanics
|-
|Wadati–Konno–Ichikawa–Schimizu
|1+1
|
|
|-
|WDVV equations
|Any
| 
|Topological field theory, QFT
|-
|WZW model
|1+1
|

|QFT
|-
|Whitham equation
|1+1
|
|water waves
|-
|Williams spray equation
|
|
|Combustion
|-
|Yamabe
|n
|
|Differential geometry
|-
|Yang–Mills (source-free)  
|Any
|
|Gauge theory, QFT
|-
|Yang–Mills (self-dual/anti-self-dual)
| 4
| 
| Instantons, Donaldson theory, QFT 
|-
|Yukawa
|1+n
|
|Meson-nucleon interactions, QFT
|-
|Zakharov system
|1+3
|
|Langmuir waves
|-
|Zakharov–Schulman
|1+3
|
|Acoustic waves
|-
|Zeldovich–Frank-Kamenetskii equation
|1+3
|
|Combustion
|-
|Zoomeron
|1+1
|
|Solitons
|-
|φ4 equation
|1+1
|
| QFT
|-
|σ-model
|1+1
|
|Harmonic maps, integrable systems, QFT
|}

References

Partial differential equations